Artsakh elects on a national level a president and a parliament. The president is elected for a five-year term by the people. 
The National Assembly (Azgayin Zhoghov) has 33 members, 16 elected for a five-year term in single seat constituencies and 17 by proportional representation. 
Artsakh has a multi-party system, with numerous parties in which no one party often has a chance of gaining power alone, and parties must work with each other to form coalition governments.

Past elections

2015 Parliamentary election

2012 Presidential election

Latest elections

Upcoming elections
The next election is scheduled to occur in 2025.

See also
 Elections in Armenia
 Foreign relations of Artsakh
 List of political parties in Artsakh
 National Assembly (Artsakh)
 Politics of Artsakh

References